BisRock is a subgenre of Pinoy rock, propagated by the Cebu rock music industry in the Philippines. The term, which is in the blended form, comes from the Cebuano words Bisaya, referring the Visayan languages, and "rock", for rock music. The term was coined by Cebuano writer Januar E. Yap in 2002 and was first applied to Missing Filemon's first album. Earning wide reception among the young in the Visayas and Mindanao, Bisrock is a fairly recent cultural phenomenon. The style started around the 1980s, when Cebu's rock scene was beginning to be labeled as "Bisrock". During this time, a group of musicians from the University of San Carlos coined the local music scene as Bisrock in support of patriotism for the Cebuano music scene. However, this genre is debatable as Bisrock seems to be popular only in Cebu. As it is, the movement died down around 2009, as even Missing Filemon themselves distanced itself from the term "Bisrock".

Notable BisRock bands
Cebuano rock bands popularizing songs written in the Cebuano language include:
 1017
 Gedz Band
 Abscond
 Abyss, The
 Agipo
 Assembly Language
 Aggressive Audio
 BTU (Beyond The Unknown)
 Cordless
 Enchi
 Emping
 Fervent
 Indephums
 Junior Kilat
 Kabobo
 Kanteen
 Kazoku
 Makadawa
 Mantequilla
 Missing Filemon
 Pavel Camoro
 Phylum
 Scrambled Eggs
 Smooth Friction
 The Ambassadors
 The Agadiers
 TimeSlot
 WetSlipperz
 Zero Info

See also
Yoyoy Villame
Max Surban

References

External links
The Bisrock Observer 
Bisrock Rules
Handuraw Jamroom 
Combolata - Proudly Bisaya Musicians and Listeners 
BisRock.Org - BisRock Events, Lyrics and Bands

20th-century music genres
21st-century music genres
Cebuano music
Music scenes
Philippine styles of music
Culture in Cebu City